Geriatric intensive care unit is a special intensive care unit dedicated to management of critically ill elderly.

Origin 
Geriatric intensive care units began because the world population is aging. Geriatric medicine is distinct from adult or pediatric medicine, especially if they are critically ill. Geriatric medicine was not included in the curricula of undergraduate or advanced medical training until recently, so not all critical care physicians are oriented to the specific needs of geriatric patients. Despite the fact that many critically ill patients are older, the training of critical care teams still lacks a geriatric focus.

Older adults admitted to intensive care units can suffer from severe infections, such as MRSA or systemic fungal infections, and may need special post-operative analgesia. People age 75+ may need assessment by special instruments to predict their ICU prognosis. One quotation has said "geriatric ICUs are the future".

World distribution
Geriatric care units are present in Japan, United States, China, Egypt, Europe France, Italy, Iran, and India.

Training & education programs 
Physicians are trained in geriatric medicine & critical care medicine.

Nurses receive special training in critical care of elderly in their basic training, advanced and clinical training.

Ventilators

A geriatric ventilator is a machine that provides mechanical ventilation by moving breathable air into and out of the lungs, to deliver breaths to a geriatric patient who is physically unable to breathe, or breathing insufficiently.

Open-source ventilators

A geriatric open-source ventilator uses open-source hardware. They are valorated in COVID-19 pandemic.

See also 
 Geriatrics
 Intensive care unit
 Open-source hardware
 Ventilator

References 

Intensive care medicine
Hospital departments
Geriatrics